The GS&WR Class 101, classified as Class 101 or Class J15 by the Great Southern Railways, was a class of 0-6-0 steam locomotives designed for working goods traffic although they did, and were quite capable of, working branch and secondary passenger trains.

History
The 101s were by far the most numerous class of locomotive (diesel or steam) ever to run in Ireland with 111 being built between 1866 and 1903. The great majority were built by the GS&WR at Inchicore Works, though the construction of some examples was contracted out to Beyer, Peacock & Company (12) and Sharp, Stewart & Company (8).

The design is attributed to Alexander McDonnell, although evidence points to him developing the design from drawings supplied from Beyer, Peacock and Company of Manchester, England.  McDonell appears to have utilised the drawings and produced a number of hybrids where parts were salvaged from a number of withdrawn  locomotives from various builders; the class 101 Inchicore Works creating locomotives broadly to the Beyer Peacock design from the withdrawn locomotives.  The first three locomotives from Inchicore, Nos. 112 (June 1866), 113 (December 1866), and 118 (May 1867) are considered hybrids; recent analysis seems to indicate all nine Inchicore builds to No. 115 in October 1869 to be hybrid builds.  Eight Beyer Peacock built Class 101 were built between May 1867 and March 1868. Inchicore built Nos. 155 and 156 with short wheelbases ( less between the second and third axles, as per Nos. 114 and 115) in 1871 before commencing new builds of standard locomotives with No. 159 in September 1871.

Locomotive superintendents John Aspinall (1883), Henry Ivatt (1886), and Robert Coey (1896) continued to build the standard 101, with few modifications until  1899.

Coey followed this in 1902/03 with the final 12 locomotives that differed by having the enlarged  boiler and a modified cab.  These were initially designated the 200 class but were brought into the 101 Class when rebuilds of earlier locomotives were equipped with the same boiler.

In 1925 the GS&WR were amalgamated with other railway companies whose territories did not extend into Northern Ireland to form Great Southern Railways (GSR), the GS&WR and Inchicore Works being the dominant party in the new concern. The 101 class generally kept to operating in the former GS&WR territory, the exception being the ex Dublin and South Eastern Railway area where the locomotive stock was in poor condition due to under investment, civil war losses, and the inadequacy of Canal Street Works. Members of the 101 class (among others) were therefore drafted in to assist commuter and other services for the DSER.

Locomotive superintendents Bazin and Harty in 1929 and 1934 introduced fifteen locomotives of the 700 (J15a)and 710 (J15b) classes which were in some respects direct developments of the 101 class. They were in many ways little better, and the 710 class in particular somewhat worse, than the latest rebuilt versions of the 101 class with superheated belpaire boilers.

D&BJR
In 1872 the Dublin and Belfast Junction Railway (D&BJR) bought two  locomotives from Beyer Peacock that were identical to those originally supplied to the GS&WR. On amalgamations these were to pass to the Northern Railway of Ireland in 1875 as Nos. 40 and 41 and before absorption into the Great Northern Railway in 1876, becoming designated Class "D".  Reputed as "fine steaming engines" they were both given rebuilds  1888 and  1914 before being finally withdrawn in 1937 and 1934 respectively, the longest surviving D&BJR locomotives.

Services
The main purpose of the type was goods train work, however soon after introduction their ability of secondary and branch line passenger and freight train work. From the turn of the twentieth century Coey and his successors introduced a number of locomotive types designed to be capable of handling heavier goods trains.

Livery
As built the locomotives would likely have carried the a dark version of the lined olive green livery of the GS&WR until around the start of the 20th century. After that, they were black with red lining until the late 1910s, when they were painted all over unlined grey. This dull but all-encompassing livery included motion, wheels, inside frames, cabs, smoke boxes and chimneys. The only relieving feature was the red buffer beam. Standard cast number plates were also painted over grey, with rim and numerals picked out in cream or very pale grey, or occasionally not at all. This livery persisted post-1925 into Great Southern Railways days, and was extended to locomotives of other constituent companies after the GSR amalgamation of that date. On the formation of CIÉ in 1945, the only change was that the cast number plates were gradually removed and pale yellow numerals were painted on instead. In addition, most tenders received a lined pale green "flying snail" logo.

While CIÉ repainted a few locomotives in green or black, all of the J15 class remained grey until withdrawal.

Preservation
Two have been preserved by the Railway Preservation Society of Ireland, Nos.184 (1880) and 186 (1879).  Both locomotives are out of service awaiting overhauls, with No. 186 last operating in late 2013.

No. 184

No. 184 has a smaller saturated boiler with round-topped firebox, and was paired with tender no. 156, an  outside-sprung tender.  To give a larger water capacity, No. 184 has been paired with the larger tender from No. 186 when used on the Irish railway network.

No. 186

No. 186, a Sharp, Stewart engine, has a superheated larger boiler with a Belpaire firebox and tender no. 375, a larger  tender.

Class: J15 
Wheels: 0-6-0 
Company: Great Southern & Western Railway 
Designer: Alexander McDonnell
Builder: Sharp, Stewart & Company, Atlas Works, Manchester (Works No. 2838)
Dates: Built:1879; Withdrawn:1964 
Boiler: Z 
Boiler diameter:  
Cylinders:  
Tractive effort: 
Total weight:  
Axle load:

In film
The preserved locomotives have appeared in various films. Most recently, No. 186 appears in the 2006 film, The Wind That Shakes the Barley. Both 184 and 186 appear in the 1979 film, The First Great Train Robbery.

References

Notes

Footnotes

Sources

External links

Steam locomotives of Ireland
Steam locomotives of Northern Ireland
0-6-0 locomotives
Railway locomotives introduced in 1866
Beyer, Peacock locomotives
Sharp Stewart locomotives
5 ft 3 in gauge locomotives